In the 2020–21 season, RC Relizane is competing in the Ligue 1 for the 8th season, and League Cup.

Squad list
Players and squad numbers last updated on 15 November 2020.Note: Flags indicate national team as has been defined under FIFA eligibility rules. Players may hold more than one non-FIFA nationality.

Competitions

Overview

{| class="wikitable" style="text-align: center"
|-
!rowspan=2|Competition
!colspan=8|Record
!rowspan=2|Started round
!rowspan=2|Final position / round
!rowspan=2|First match	
!rowspan=2|Last match
|-
!
!
!
!
!
!
!
!
|-
| Ligue 1

|  
| To be confirmed
| In Progress
| In Progress
|-
| League Cup

| Round of 16
| To be confirmed
| In Progress
| In Progress
|-
! Total

Ligue 1

League table

Results summary

Results by round

Matches
On 22 October 2020, the Algerian Ligue Professionnelle 1 fixtures were announced.

Algerian League Cup

Squad information

Playing statistics

|-
! colspan=10 style=background:#dcdcdc; text-align:center| Goalkeepers

|-
! colspan=10 style=background:#dcdcdc; text-align:center| Defenders

|-
! colspan=10 style=background:#dcdcdc; text-align:center| Midfielders

|-
! colspan=10 style=background:#dcdcdc; text-align:center| Forwards

|-
! colspan=10 style=background:#dcdcdc; text-align:center| Players transferred out during the season

Goalscorers
Includes all competitive matches. The list is sorted alphabetically by surname when total goals are equal.

Transfers

In

Out

Notes

References

2020-21
Algerian football clubs 2020–21 season